Trevor Michael Richards (born May 15, 1993) is an American professional baseball pitcher for the Toronto Blue Jays of Major League Baseball (MLB). He previously played for the Miami Marlins, Tampa Bay Rays and Milwaukee Brewers. He made his debut for the Marlins in 2018.

Career

Amateur/Gateway Grizzlies
Richards attended Mater Dei High School in Breese, Illinois. In 2011, his senior year, he went 9-1 with a 1.07 ERA. After high school, he enrolled and played college baseball at Drury University. As a senior in 2015, he went 5-3 with a 3.61 ERA in 11 starts. He was not drafted by an MLB team in the 2015 MLB draft, and signed with the Gateway Grizzlies of the independent Frontier League.

Miami Marlins
After one and-a-half seasons with the Grizzlies, he was signed by the Miami Marlins in July 2016. He spent 2016 with the Batavia Muckdogs and the Greensboro Grasshoppers, both in Single-A, posting a combined  record and 2.48 ERA in nine starts (11 appearances). In 2017, he was named the Marlins Minor League Pitcher of the Year after going  with a 2.53 ERA and 158 strikeouts in 27 games (25 starts) between the Advanced-A Jupiter Hammerheads and the Double-A Jacksonville Jumbo Shrimp.

On April 2, 2018, Richards was called up by the Miami Marlins to make his first MLB start. He pitched  innings, giving up eight hits and five runs (all earned) while striking out five and walking one; he took the loss, as the Marlins were defeated by the Boston Red Sox, 7–3. On April 25, facing Clayton Kershaw and the Los Angeles Dodgers, Richards pitched  innings, giving up one hit and striking out 10. Richards finished the 2018 season with a 4-9 record in 25 starts. He struck out 130 batters in  innings.

For the 2019 season, Richards began the season in the Marlins rotation. He was moved to the bullpen on July 26 after going 3-12 in 20 starts.

Tampa Bay Rays
On July 31, 2019, Richards was traded to the Tampa Bay Rays (along with Nick Anderson) in exchange for Jesús Sánchez and Ryne Stanek. He made his first start as a Ray on August 18, 2019 against the Detroit Tigers, allowing two runs across three and a half innings in a 5–4 Tampa Bay victory. In 2020 for the Rays, Richards pitched to a bloated 5.91 ERA and 1.72 WHIP in 9 appearances, including four starts. In 2021, Richards had 16 strikeouts in 12 innings for the Rays.

Milwaukee Brewers
On May 21, 2021, the Rays traded Richards and Willy Adames to the Milwaukee Brewers in exchange for Drew Rasmussen and J. P. Feyereisen. In 15 appearances and  innings before being traded, Richards posted a 3-0 record on a 3.20 ERA.

Toronto Blue Jays 
On July 6, 2021, the Brewers traded Richards to the Toronto Blue Jays along with Bowden Francis in exchange for Rowdy Tellez.

On January 13, 2023, Richards signed a one-year, $1.5 million contract with the Blue Jays, avoiding salary arbitration.

Personal life
Richards grew up a St. Louis Cardinals fan. He and his wife, Aunna, became engaged in 2018 and married in 2019. They reside in Springfield, Missouri.

References

Further reading

External links

1993 births
Living people
People from Breese, Illinois
Baseball players from Illinois
Major League Baseball pitchers
Miami Marlins players
Tampa Bay Rays players
Milwaukee Brewers players
Toronto Blue Jays players
Drury Panthers baseball players
Gateway Grizzlies players
Batavia Muckdogs players
Greensboro Grasshoppers players
Jupiter Hammerheads players
Jacksonville Jumbo Shrimp players
New Orleans Baby Cakes players
Durham Bulls players